The Polecat Bench Formation is a geologic formation in Montana. It preserves fossils dating back to the Paleogene period. The polyglyphanodontian lizard Chamops is known from this formation.

See also

 List of fossiliferous stratigraphic units in Montana
 Paleontology in Montana

References

Paleogene Montana
Paleogene geology of Wyoming
Thanetian Stage
Ypresian Stage